Thomas Wake may refer to:

 Thomas Wake, 2nd Baron Wake of Liddell (1297–1349)
 Thomas Wake (MP) for Northamptonshire (UK Parliament constituency)
 Thomas Wake (pirate), a late 17th-century privateer and pirate

See also
 Thomas Wakeman (1846–1886), a Native American who organized the first Sioux Indian YMCA
 Thomas Wakefeld (died 1575), an English academic
 Wake (surname)